Ziaratgah-e Pir Almas (also Romanized as Zīāratgāh-e Pīr Almās; also known as Pīr Almās and Por Almās) is a village in Gonbaki Rural District, Gonbaki District, Rigan County, Kerman Province, Iran. At the 2006 census, its population was 35, in 7 families.

References 

Populated places in Rigan County